Tom Rodden is Chief Scientific Adviser for the UK Government’s Department for Culture, Media and Sport. He was previously Deputy Chief Executive of the Engineering and Physical Sciences Research Council (EPSRC). Tom is Professor of Computing at the University of Nottingham and co-director of the Mixed Reality Laboratory, an interdisciplinary research facility. In 2008, as a member of the UK Research Assessment Exercise 2008 computing panel, he was responsible for assessing the international quality of computer science research across all UK departments. In 2014 he served in the Research Excellence Framework assessment panel for computing and he is the deputy chair of the Hong Kong RAE 2014 computing panel.

References

Academics of the University of Nottingham
Year of birth missing (living people)
Living people